CFSX is an AM radio station in Stephenville, Newfoundland and Labrador, Canada, broadcasting at 870 kHz. Originally launched as a repeater on November 13, 1964, it opened its own studios in 1970. The station is owned by Stingray Group. It is an affiliate of VOCM.

In 1985, CFSX moved from 910 to its current frequency, 870.

In September 2016, CFSX was shut down by Newcap Radio without any notice. The station is now a full-time repeater of CFCB in Corner Brook, changing its identity to VOCM. Before then, CFSX operated as a daytime station, and served as a nighttime repeater to CFCB.

CFSX also operated repeat transmitters in two locations:
 CFGN-FM 96.7 in Port aux Basques (Originally a full-time repeater of CFCB)
 CFCV-FM 97.7 in St. Andrew's

From 1973 to the 1990s, CFGN and CFCV operated independently of CFSX and CFCB in the daytime, and served as CFCB's nighttime and weekend repeater until it became a daytime repeater of CFSX.

On April 2, 2001, the sale of Humber Valley Broadcasting Co. Ltd. to Newcap Inc. was approved. This included CFSX, as well as:

 CFCB Corner Brook
 CFDL-FM Deer Lake
 CFNW Port aux Choix
 CFNN-FM St. Anthony
 CFGN Port-aux-Basques
 CFCV-FM St. Andrew's
 CFLN Goose Bay
 CFLW Wabush
 CFLC-FM Churchill Falls

References

External links 
 VOCM
 
 

Fsx
Fsx
FSX
Radio stations established in 1964